All three land mammal species once endemic to the Balearic Islands, Spain (the Majorcan giant dormouse, the Balearic shrew and the goat-like ruminant Myotragus balearicus) are currently extinct, while those presently found on the archipelago have been introduced voluntarily or accidentally by humans in colonization waves beginning in the Neolithic.

The following tags are used to highlight each species' conservation status as assessed by the International Union for Conservation of Nature.

Order: Rodentia (rodents) 

Rodents make up the largest order of mammals, with over 40% of mammalian species. They have two incisors in the upper and lower jaw which grow continually and must be kept short by gnawing.

Suborder: Sciuromorpha
Family: Gliridae (dormice)
Subfamily: Leithiinae
Genus: Eliomys
 Garden dormouse, E. quercinus  introduced
Genus: Hypnomys
 Mallorcan giant dormouse, H. morpheus 
Suborder: Myomorpha
Family: Muridae (mice and rats)
Subfamily: Murinae
Genus: Apodemus
 Wood mouse, A. sylvaticus  introduced
Genus: Mus
 House mouse, M. musculus  introduced
 Algerian mouse, M. spretus  introduced
Genus: Rattus
 Black rat, R. rattus  introduced
 Brown rat, R. norvegicus  introduced

Order: Lagomorpha (lagomorphs) 

The lagomorphs comprise two families, Leporidae (hares and rabbits), and Ochotonidae (pikas). Though they can resemble rodents, and were classified as a superfamily in that order until the early 20th century, they have since been considered a separate order. They differ from rodents in a number of physical characteristics, such as having four incisors in the upper jaw rather than two.

Family: Leporidae (rabbits, hares)
Genus: Lepus
 Granada hare, L. granatensis  introduced
Genus: Oryctolagus
 European rabbit, O. cuniculus  introduced

Order: Erinaceomorpha (hedgehogs and gymnures) 

The order Erinaceomorpha contains a single family, Erinaceidae, which comprise the hedgehogs and gymnures. The hedgehogs are easily recognised by their spines while gymnures look more like large rats.

Family: Erinaceidae (hedgehogs)
Subfamily: Erinaceinae
Genus: Atelerix
 North African hedgehog, A. algirus  introduced

Order: Soricomorpha (shrews, moles, and solenodons) 

The "shrew-forms" are insectivorous mammals. The shrews and solenodons closely resemble mice while the moles are stout bodied burrowers.

Family: Soricidae (shrews)
Subfamily: Crocidurinae
Genus: Crocidura
 North African white-toothed shrew, C. ichnusae  introduced
 Lesser white-toothed shrew, C. suaveolens  introduced
Subfamily: Soricinae
Genus: Nesiotites
 Balearic shrew, N. hidalgo

Order: Chiroptera (bats) 

The bats' most distinguishing feature is that their forelimbs are developed as wings, making them the only mammals capable of flight. Bat species account for about 20% of all mammals.

Family: Miniopteridae (long-winged bats)
Subfamily: Miniopterinae
Genus: Miniopterus
 Common bent-wing bat, M. schreibersi 
Family: Molossidae (free-tailed bats)
Subfamily: Molossinae
Genus: Tadarida
 European free-tailed bat, T. teniotis 
Family: Rhinolophidae (horseshoe bats) 
Subfamily: Rhinolophinae
Genus: Rhinolophus
 Greater horseshoe bat, R. ferrumequinum 
 Lesser horseshoe bat, R. hipposideros 
 Mehely's horseshoe bat, R. mehelyi 
Family: Vespertilionidae (mouse-eared bats)
Subfamily: Myotinae
Genus: Myotis
 Lesser mouse-eared bat, M. blythii 
 Long-fingered bat, M. capaccinii 
 Geoffroy's bat, M. emarginatus 
 Greater mouse-eared bat, M. myotis 
 Natterer's bat, M. nattereri 
Subfamily: Verpertilioninae
Genus: Barbastella
 Barbastelle, B. barbastellus 
Genus: Eptesicus
 Serotine bat, E. serotinus 
Genus: Hypsugo
 Savi's pipistrelle, H. savii 
Genus: Plecotus
 Grey long-eared bat, P. austriacus 
Genus: Pipistrellus
 Kuhl's pipistrelle, P. kuhlii 
 Common pipistrelle, P. pipistrellus 
 Soprano pipistrelle, P. pygmaeus

Order: Cetacea (whales) 

The order Cetacea includes whales, dolphins and porpoises. They are the mammals most fully adapted to aquatic life with a spindle-shaped nearly hairless body, protected by a thick layer of blubber, and forelimbs and tail modified to provide propulsion underwater.

Suborder: Mysticeti
Family: Balaenopteridae (rorquals)
Genus: Balaenoptera
 Fin whale, B. physalus 
Suborder: Odontoceti
Family: Delphinidae (dolphins and pilot whales)
Genus: Delphinus
 Short-beaked common dolphin, D. delphis 
Genus: Globicephala
 Long-finned pilot whale, G. melas 
Genus: Grampus
 Risso's dolphin, G. griseus 
Genus: Orcinus
 Orca, O. orca 
Genus: Pseudorca
 False killer whale, P. crassidens 
Genus: Stenella
 Striped dolphin, S. coeruleoalba 
Genus: Tursiops
 Common bottlenose dolphin, T. truncatus 
Family: Physeteridae (sperm whales)
Genus: Physeter
 Sperm whale, P. macrocephalus 
Family: Ziphiidae (beaked whales)
Genus: Ziphius
 Cuvier's beaked whale, Z. cavirostris

Order: Carnivora (carnivorans) 

There are over 260 species of carnivorans, the majority of which feed primarily on meat. They have a characteristic skull shape and dentition.

Family: Viverridae (civets and mongooses)
Genus: Genetta
 Common genet, G. genetta  introduced
Suborder: Caniformia
Family: Mustelidae (weasels)
Genus: Martes
 European pine marten, M. martes  introduced
Genus: Mustela
 Least weasel, M. nivalis  introduced

Order: Artiodactyla (even-toed ungulates) 

The even-toed ungulates are ungulates whose weight is borne about equally by the third and fourth toes, rather than mostly or entirely by the third as in perissodactyls. There are about 220 artiodactyl species, including many that are of great economic importance to humans.

Family: Bovidae (cattle, antelope, sheep, goats)
Subfamily: Caprinae
Genus: Capra
 Balearean boc, C. capra var. majorcan introduced
Genus: Myotragus
 Balearic cave goat, M. balearicus

Locally extinct 

The following species are locally extinct in the area but continue to exist elsewhere:
Mediterranean monk seal, Monachus monachus

Notes

References

 Aulagnier, S. et al. (2008) Guide des mammifères d'Europe, d'Afrique du Nord et de Moyen-Orient. Delachaux et Niestlé, Paris
 Purroy, F.J. and Varela, J.M. (2003) Guía de los Mamíferos de España. Península, Baleares y Canarias. Lynx Edicions, Barcelona.

See also
List of chordate orders
Lists of mammals by region
List of prehistoric mammals
Mammal classification
List of mammals described in the 2000s

M
Mammals
Balearic Islands
Balearic Islands